Fairy Dreams is a studio album by David Arkenstone, released by the record label Green Hill Productions in 2019. The album received a Grammy Award nomination for Best New Age Album.

References

2010 albums
New-age albums by American artists